The 2014 Eurocup Formula Renault 2.0 season was a multi-event motor racing championship for open wheel, formula racing cars held across Europe. The championship featured drivers competing in 2 litre Formula Renault single seat race cars that conformed to the technical regulations for the championship. The 2014 season was the 24th Eurocup Formula Renault 2.0 season organised by Renault Sport. The season began at Motorland Aragón on 26 April and finished on 19 October at Jerez. The series formed part of the World Series by Renault meetings at seven double header events.

The championship titles were secured by driver Nyck de Vries, who spent his third season in the series and his team Koiranen GP. Series débutant Dennis Olsen finished as runner-up with wins at Spa-Francorchamps and the Nürburgring. Alexander Albon, who raced for KTR, completed the top three in the drivers' standings; all three drivers received a prize test in a Formula Renault 3.5 Series car. Manor Motorsport MP Motorsport driver Andrea Pizzitola was victorious at Motorland Aragón and the Hungaroring and finished fourth. Olsen's teammate Bruno Bonifacio won the other race at Spa, finishing in fifth position in the standings. Kevin Jörg, who finished behind Bonifacio, achieved a win at Moscow Raceway. The other wins were taken by Fortec Motorsports driver Jack Aitken at the Hungaroring, ART Junior Team driver Aurélien Panis at Moscow Raceway, while guest driver George Russell took a victory at Jerez.

Teams and drivers

Race calendar and results
The calendar for the 2014 season was announced on 20 October 2013, in the final day of the 2013 season. All seven rounds formed meetings of the 2014 World Series by Renault season. The championship visited the Circuito de Jerez for the first time and returned to the Nürburgring. The Red Bull Ring and Barcelona were removed from the schedule.

Championship standings
 Points for both championships were awarded as follows:

Drivers' Championship

Teams' Championship

References

External links
 Renault-Sport official website

Eurocup Formula Renault 2.0
Eurocup
Renault Eurocup